Muhamet Ghopur (born 21 September 1997) is a Chinese footballer currently playing as a defender for Xinjiang Tianshan Leopard.

Career statistics

Club
.

References

1997 births
Living people
Chinese footballers
Association football defenders
China League One players
Xinjiang Tianshan Leopard F.C. players